The Bronze Age town of Tuttul is identified with the archaeological site of Tell Bi'a in Raqqa Governorate, northern Syria. Tell Bi'a is located near the modern city of Raqqa and the confluence of the rivers Balikh and Euphrates.

History
During the Middle Bronze Age (c. 2000–1600 BCE), Tuttul was a sacred city to the god Dagan, worshipped across the Ancient Near East. However, the settlement at Tell Bi'a had been occupied since the mid-3rd millennium BCE. This town has sometimes also been called the "Northern Tuttul" with reference to an implied "Southern Tuttul", which was possibly located on the Iraqi Euphrates between the ancient cities of Mari and Babylon. However, this is a debated issue. The identification of the so-called "Southern Tuttul" with modern Hit is uncertain, as Hit is referenced to several times in the Mari archives via its modern name.

References 

Populated places established in the 3rd millennium BC
Archaeological sites in Raqqa Governorate
Bronze Age sites in Syria
Former populated places in Syria
Mari, Syria
Raqqa
Dagon
Holy cities